Gonia Monastery,  Monastery of Our Lady of Gonia or Monastery of Panagia Hodegetria (Μονή της Οδηγήτριας) is an Orthodox monastery located 1 km north of Kolymvari and some 26 km from Chania, on the southeast coast of the Rodopos peninsula in Crete, Greece, overlooking the Gulf of Chania.  The monastery was given the same name as  Hodegon Monastery in Constantinople. Both were named in honor of the sacred icon painted by Luke the Evanglist.  The icon featured the Virgin and Child.  It is traditionally called Hodegetria ("She who shows the Way").  Some churches adopted the name Madonna of Constantinopli in honor of the Hodegetria icon.

History
Dedicated to the Assumption of the Virgin (feast day: August 15), the monastery was founded in the 9th century and was originally dedicated to St. George. It was formerly situated at Menies, on the ruins of the ancient temple of Artemis Britomartis (Diktynna). The monastery was built in the 13th century adjacent to a cemetery, but it was rebuilt between 1618 and 1634 in its present location, with Venetian influences in its architectural design and adornments. The distinctive fountain in front of the monastery's entrance was built in 1708, and the belfry in 1849.

According to monks the present location at Kolymvari was considered safer from attack. Despite this, the monastery was heavily damaged by Ottoman bombardment on many occasions throughout its history including in 1645, 1652, 1822, 1841, and finally in 1867, during the Cretan Revolt (1866–1869) against the Ottoman Empire. Evidence of this last attack can be evidenced today by the remaining cannonball lodged in the seaside monastery wall. During World War II the monastery was partly destroyed by German bombing and it became one of the most important areas of Cretan resistance to Nazi Germany.

Architecture and relics

Gonia Monastery is a Venetian-style fortress monastery. Its main church has a narthex, a dome, and a number of chapels surrounded by a courtyard. The courtyard area also contains the quarters of the abbot and monks of the monastery, along with the refectory and storehouses.

Today, the monastery and its museum contain numerous Byzantine artifacts from the 15th to the 17th centuries, including Cretan icons by Parthenios, Andreas Ritzos, and Neilos. It also has numerous relics and other rare religious treasures from the Byzantine period, and ancient inscriptions on the walls.

References

Monasteries in Crete
Buildings and structures in Chania (regional unit)
9th-century establishments in Greece
Greek Orthodox monasteries in Greece